Ante Miročević (born 6 August 1952) is a former Montenegrin footballer who played as a midfielder. He earned six caps for Yugoslavia. He was the first player playing in a club from Montenegro to earn a cap for the Yugoslavia national team.

Club career
He became the first foreign player to sign for Sheffield Wednesday in 1980; however, his spell at the club was not a success despite being the club's record signing at the time. He did score Wednesday's only goal in the 2–1 defeat to Brighton & Hove Albion in the 1983 FA Cup Semi-Final at Highbury.

International career
Miročević made his debut for Yugoslavia in a November 1978 Balkan Cup match against Greece and has earned a total of 6 caps, scoring 2 goals. His final international was an April 1980 friendly match against Poland.

References

External links

Profile on Serbian federation official site

1952 births
Living people
Footballers from Podgorica
Association football midfielders
Yugoslav footballers
Yugoslavia international footballers
Olympic footballers of Yugoslavia
Footballers at the 1980 Summer Olympics
FK Budućnost Podgorica players
Sheffield Wednesday F.C. players
Yugoslav First League players
English Football League players
Yugoslav expatriate footballers
Expatriate footballers in England
Yugoslav expatriate sportspeople in England